Piolenc is a commune in the Vaucluse department in the Provence-Alpes-Côte d'Azur region in southeastern France.

History
Piolenc was the site of a Cluniac priory.

Population

Traditions
Wine is the main activity of this city, but the dominant besides of the agricultural production is the "French Provence garlic", as such the "garlic cultural festival" takes place every summer in August, during the last week-end.

Personalities
Piolenc was the birthplace :
 Jean-Louis Trintignant (1930–2022), actor
 André-Philippe Corsin (1773–1854)

Twin towns
The town is twinned with Kirchheim am Neckar, in Baden-Württemberg, Germany.

See also
Communes of the Vaucluse department

References

External links
 Town council website (in French)

Communes of Vaucluse